The Bourrasque class was a group of twelve French Navy destroyers (torpilleur) laid down in 1923 and in service from 1926 to 1950. Along with the heavier , they were part of a plan to modernise the French fleet after the First World War.  The Bourrasques were smaller and slower than the Chacals, but were nonetheless comparable with the British W class. The class saw varied service in the Second World War, in five different navies, on both sides. These ships were named after types of wind.

The design was used as the basis for the two s built for the Polish Navy during the late 1920s.

Design and description
They were powered by two geared steam turbines, each driving one propeller shaft, using steam provided by three du Temple boilers.

The main armament of the Bourrasque-class ships consisted of four Canon de  Modèle 1919 guns in shielded single mounts, one superfiring pair each fore and aft of the superstructure. Their anti-aircraft (AA) armament consisted of a single Canon de  Modèle 1924 gun. The ships carried two triple mounts of  torpedo tubes amidships. A pair of depth charge chutes were built into their stern that housed a total of sixteen  depth charges.

Ships

Service
Four ships of the class - Bourrasque, Cyclone, Orage and Sirocco - were lost in 1940; Orage on 23 May, sunk by German bombers; Bourasque by German mines and artillery fire on 30 May while evacuating troops from Dunkirk; Sirocco on 31 May, to German torpedo boats while engaged in the same operation; and Cyclone, having been badly damaged on 30 May by torpedo boats was scuttled at Brest on 18 June to prevent her capture.

Both were eventually transferred to the Free French. Somewhat circuitously, Ouragan was first transferred to the Free Polish Navy. Both survived the war.

Tornade and Tramontaine were lost in the same engagement off Oran on 8 November 1942, against allied units protecting Operation Torch. Typhon was scuttled in Oran harbour to stop her being acquired by the Allies.

Simoun and Tempête, based at Casablanca, joined the Allies in November 1942. They may have joined the battleship  in engaging the Allied 'Covering Group', a taskforce based on the battleship .

Trombe was the only ship of the class to be scuttled at Toulon in November 1942 alongside much of the French Navy. She was later raised, commissioned into the Italian Navy as FR31, and then re-transferred to the Free French on 28 October 1943. This destroyer was crippled (constructive total loss) by a fascist Italian MTM explosive motorboat on 17 April 1945 in the Gulf of Genoa.

Notes

References

External links
Bourrasque class on uboat.net
"Mistral" : Un nom, une histoire

 
Destroyer classes
World War II destroyers of France
Ship classes of the French Navy